Funerary cones were small cones made from clay that were used in ancient Egypt, almost exclusively in the Theban Necropolis. The items were placed over the entrance of the chapel of a tomb. Early examples have been found from the Eleventh Dynasty. However, they are generally undecorated. During the New Kingdom, the cones were smaller in size and inscribed in hieroglyphs with the title and name of the tomb owner, often with a short prayer. The exact purpose of the cones is unknown, but hypotheses exist that they variously served as passports, architectural features, and symbolic offerings, among others.

Funerary cones were first organized into a corpus by Davies and Macadam (1957). This catalog was later supplemented by Vivo and Costa (1997). In the 21st century, Dibley and Lipkin (2009) and Zenihiro (2009) have compiled more complete publications, with Theis (2017) contributing additional cones from books, articles, auction and exhibition catalogues for consideration.

See also
Chamber tomb
Clay nail–(Mesopotamia)

References

External links

The World of Funerary Cones

Further reading
 

Theban tombs
Ancient Near and Middle East clay objects
Terracotta sculptures